Pine tar is a form of wood tar produced by the high temperature carbonization of pine wood in anoxic conditions (dry distillation or destructive distillation). The wood is rapidly decomposed by applying heat and pressure in a closed container; the primary resulting products are charcoal and pine tar.

Pine tar consists primarily of aromatic hydrocarbons, tar acids, and tar bases. Components of tar vary according to the pyrolytic process (e.g. method, duration, temperature) and origin of the wood (e.g. age of pine trees, type of soil, and moisture conditions during tree growth). The choice of wood, design of kiln, burning, and collection of the tar can vary. Only pine stumps and roots are used in the traditional production of pine tar.

Pine tar has a long history as a wood preservative, as a wood sealant for maritime use, in roofing construction and maintenance, in soaps, and in the treatment of carbuncles and skin diseases, such as psoriasis, eczema, and rosacea. It is used in baseball to enhance the grip of a hitter's bat; it is also sometimes used by pitchers to improve their grip on the ball, in violation of the rules.

History
Pine tar has long been used in Scandinavian nations as a preservative for wood which may be exposed to harsh conditions, including outdoor furniture and ship decking and rigging.  The high-grade pine tar used in this application is often called Stockholm Tar since, for many years, a single company held a royal monopoly on its export out of Stockholm, Sweden.  It is also known as "Archangel Tar".  Tar and pitch for maritime use was in such demand that it became an important export for the American colonies, which had extensive pine forests.  North Carolinians became known as "Tar Heels."

Use
Pine tar was used as a preservative on the bottoms of traditional Nordic-style skis until modern synthetic materials replaced wood in their construction. It also helped waxes adhere, which aided such skis’ grip and glide.

Pine tar is widely used as a veterinary care product, particularly as an antiseptic and hoof care treatment for horses and cattle. It also has been used when chickens start pecking the low hen. Applying a smear of pine tar on the hens' wound acts as a natural germicidal/antibacterial agent that discourages continued attacks on the affected hen due to its foreign texture.

Pine tar is used as a softening solvent in the rubber industry, for treating and fabricating construction materials, and in special paints.

As a wood preservative
Pine tar is combined with gum turpentine and boiled linseed oil to create a wood preservative. First, a thin coat is applied using a mixture with a greater proportion of turpentine. This allows it to permeate deeper into the oakum and fibre of the wood and lets the tar seep into any pinholes and larger gaps that might be in the planks. The tar weeps out to the exterior and indicates where the boat needs the most attention. This is followed with a thicker standard mix. Such treatments, while effective, must be continually reapplied.

Weatherproofing rope
Traditionally, hemp and other natural fibers were the norm for rope production. Such rope would quickly rot when exposed to rain, and was typically tarred to preserve it. The tar would stain the hands of ship's crews, and British Navy seamen became known as "tars."

Baseball

Pine tar is applied to the handles of baseball bats to improve a batter's grip.

Rule 1.10(c) of the 2002 Official rules of Major League Baseball restricts application to the lower 18 inches of a bat. The most famous example of the rule being applied is the Pine Tar Incident, which occurred during the July 24, 1983 game between the Kansas City Royals and New York Yankees which resulted in a George Brett go-ahead home run in the ninth inning being nullified and the game being protested.

Pine tar is also sometimes used illegally by pitchers to improve their grip on the ball in cold weather. This is not allowed due to a regulation prohibiting the application of any foreign substance to a ball (except grip-improving baseball rubbing mud applied by the umpires).

Medical
Pine tar has historically been used for treating skin conditions, usually as an additive in cold process solid soap or lotions. Due to the high presence of phenol in the early manufacturing of pine tar, it was deemed carcinogenic. However, now much of the phenol has been removed. Pine tar was banned by the FDA along with many other ingredients categorized as over the counter drugs, due to a lack of evidence of safety and effectiveness for the specific uses named. However, clinical tests in Australia in 2017 demonstrated that the greatest risk comes from acute sensitivity for those with severe dermatological conditions, and if it comes in contact with the eyes. It is important to note that the number of positive reactions for wood tars was not significantly greater than those for other common allergens. In addition, the concentration of pine tar in topical products available in Australia is up to 2.3%, which is up to four times less than that tested in these studies.

Pine tar has been used to cover peck wounds in captive bird flocks such as chickens, to prevent continued pecking on a wound and cannibalism. Pine tar is also used in veterinary medicine as an expectorant and an antiseptic in chronic skin conditions.

See also
Coal tar
Creosote
Tarpaulin
Tarring and feathering (punishment)

References

External links

History of Pine Tar

Wood products
Food additives
Non-timber forest products
Baseball bats
Maritime culture